HasdrubalI (ʿAzrubaʿal, "Help of Baal") was a Magonid king of Ancient Carthage, a kingdom with its capital, Carthage, located in present-day Tunisia, from 530 to 510BC.

Rule
In the mid 520sBC, Hasdrubal, along with his brother Hamilcar I, launched an expedition against Sardinia.

Hasdrubal was elected as "King" eleven times, was granted a triumph four times (the only Carthaginian to receive this honour – there is no record of anyone else being honoured to that extent by Carthage) and died of his battle wounds received in Sardinia. Carthage had engaged in a 25-year struggle in Sardinia, where the natives may have received aid from Sybaris, then the richest city in Magna Graecia and an ally of the Phocaeans. The Carthaginians faced resistance from Nora and Sulci in Sardinia, while Carales and Tharros had submitted willingly to Carthaginian rule. Hasdrubal's war against the Libyans failed to stop the annual tribute payment.

Around this time, the Carthaginians managed to defeat and drive away the colonisation attempt near Leptis Magna in Libya by the Spartan prince Dorieus after three years. Dorieus was later defeated and killed at Eryx in Sicily (around 510BC) while attempting to establish a foothold in Western Sicily.

See also
 Other Hasdrubals in Carthaginian history

References

Citations

Bibliography
 . 

Magonids
Monarchs of Carthage
6th-century BC rulers
6th-century BC Punic people
510 BC deaths